is a former Japanese football player.

Playing career
Morita was born in Kochi Prefecture on December 9, 1978. After graduating from Juntendo University, he joined newly was promoted to J2 League club, Yokohama FC in 2001. He became a regular player as left side back from first season. However he could not play at all in the match from summer 2002. In 2003, he moved to Regional Leagues club TDK.

After finished at TDK in 2003 season, Morita had also a short spell in Europe with Serbian club FK Rad, playing with them the second half of the 2003-04 First League of Serbia and Montenegro season.

In September 2004, Morita returned to Japan and joined J2 club Mito HollyHock. He mainly played many matches as left midfielder. In 2006, he moved to J1 League club Ventforet Kofu. However he could not play at all in the match. In 2007, he moved to Prefectural Leagues club Tonan SC Gunma (later Tonan Maebashi). Tonan was promoted to Regional Leagues from 2009. He retired end of 2011 season.

Club statistics

References

External links

 Shingo Morita at FootballJapan
 Shingo Morita at Srbijafudbal

1978 births
Living people
Juntendo University alumni
Association football people from Kōchi Prefecture
Japanese footballers
J1 League players
J2 League players
Yokohama FC players
Blaublitz Akita players
Mito HollyHock players
Ventforet Kofu players
FK Rad players
Japanese expatriate footballers
Japanese expatriate sportspeople in Serbia
Expatriate footballers in Serbia and Montenegro
Association football defenders